Impact insulation class (or IIC) is an  integer-number rating of how well a building floor attenuates impact sounds, such as footsteps.  A larger number means more attenuation.  The scale, like the decibel scale for sound, is logarithmic. The IIC is derived from ASTM method E989, which in turn uses a tapping machine specified in ASTM method E492.

The IIC number is derived from sound attenuation values tested at sixteen standard frequencies from 100 to 3150 Hz. "Real world" footstep noise is also generated at frequencies below 100 Hz, so the IIC value may not accurately describe the complete noise attenuation profile of a floor.

References

Sound measurements